EJ is a female pop/urban singer based in London once signed to Epic Records, Sony.

Early life 
Edwina Johnson in Stockholm, Sweden in the late 1980s, born to an Afro-Cuban father who was a guirarist and a Barbadian mother.

At the age of 12, EJ and her mother moved to London, where the cultural difference had a positive impact upon EJ and her musical career, she said the city allowed her to develop her music.

2011-present 
Los Angeles, Atlanta and London have been the base for much of EJ's professional music career and the influences can be heard in her music, which she describes when talking about her song 'Bangers and Mash', "…it's an ATL beat that has really English lyrics to it, it's a very crunk/hip hop beat." This song was chosen as part of the soundtrack of the film Keith Lemon: The Film.

In contrast EJ's first single, 'Mama I'm Gonna Sing,' was influenced through her experience of gospel music as well as early hip hop and pop experiences, "My Grandmother took me to church every Sunday and her house was always swarming with us grandchildren," EJ says, "I had the mix of church singing and then coming back to her house to see my cousins breakdancing and listening to Michael Jackson and Neneh Cherry."

EJ's music has received an impressive reception, where her debut single 'Mama, I'm Gonna Sing' has enjoyed airplay on BBC 1Xtra, Kiss and BBC Radio 1. The single has also been remixed by Jamie Jones, Savage Skulls and Pete Tong.

She has also begun playing many shows in and around London; such has Yoyo in Notting Hill Arts Club alongside artists such as Lily Mckenzie.

References

External links
YouTube

Year of birth missing (living people)
Living people
Singers from Stockholm
Swedish emigrants to the United Kingdom
English women singers